Musawir Munir Musawir is a Pakistani artist. He was born in Dhurnal, a village of Talagang in the Pakistani state of Punjab. Munir paints with both hands.

He devoted himself to the cause of “Peace and Love” throughout the world. The main theme of his paintings are landscapes, artistic Lettering, International Problems, women’s issues and Pakistan regional Culture.

He has conducted around 25 exhibitions nationally and internationally and got many Medals and appreciation certificate.

Recognition
 Appreciation Certificate from  Syed Aftab Ahmed Shah, Assistant  Commissioner Talagang 1976.
 Appreciation Certificate from Chairman Joint Chief of Staff Committee, Rawalpindi on 12.09.1977. 
 Appreciation Certificate from  Syed Aftab Ahmed Shah,  Assistant  Commissioner Talagang 1977.
 Appreciation Certificate from  Dr.Liaqat Ali Khan Niazi, Deputy  Commissioner Chakwal .
 Excellent Diploma on the occasion of 4th Safe Games Islamabad in 1989.
 Honorary Shield due  to Excellent Performance on 27.10.1989, presented by Maj. Gen Muhammad Rashid Baig, Secretary General Organizing Committee.
 Appreciation Certificate from  Maj. Gen Frontier Crops Ghazi ud din Rana, on 24.02.1990.
 Gold Medal from Abaseen Art Council, Peshawar on 24.02.1990, Presented by Ghazi ud Din Rana Maj. Gen HQ Frontier Crops, Peshawar.
 Appreciation Certificate from  Mr.Rahim Dad Khan, Minister for Culture & Sports NWFP, on 17.03.1990. 
 Best Performance Certificate from Mr. Ghulam Ishaque Khan, President of Pakistan, on 14.08.1990.
 Honorary Shield due  to Excellent Performance on 14.08.1990, presented by Aziz Ahmed Hashmi, Director Education Rawalpindi Division.
 Honorary Shield due  to Excellent Performance  presented by Syed Ghulam Assab Shah, Chief Designer PTV Islamabad on 25.12.1992.
 Appreciation Certificate from  Zia Shahid, Chief Editor roznama “Khabrian” , on 25.12.1993.
 Performance Award from President “Man Bhawan Arts Council Chakwal” on 25.12.1993.
 Honorary Shield due  to Excellent Performance in 1993, presented by Mr. Waseem Sajjad, Acting President of Islamic Republic of Pakistan.
 Awarded by Main Award of District Chakwal “DHAN CHURASI” presented by  Syed Tanveer Abbas Jaafri, Deputy Commissioner Chakwal on 10.01.1994.
 Best Performance Award from “Talagang Arts Society” Presented by Khushnood Ali Khan, Resident Editor Roznama Khabrain on 14.10.1994.
 Appreciation Certificate from  Superintendent of Police Chakwal, on 21.09.1998. 
 Appreciation Certificate from  Weekly  Newspaper “Talagang Times”,on 28.05.2000. 
 Appreciation Certificate from  EM-Enterprises (PVT) LTD, on 28.05.2000.
 Appreciation Certificate from  Weekly Newspaper “Mutaqarib ”,on 16.07.2000.
 Konica Centuria World 1st Award from Japan along with $700 Presented by Aftab Ahmed Shah, Director General Soil Survey of Pakistan on 15.11.2001.
 Main Award of Talagang "Talagang Talent Award(TTA)"due to outstanding performance in relevant Fields, Presented by Mr. Sohail Shehzad Assistant    Commissioner Talagang on 14.08.2002. 
 Best Performance Certificate from Government of Punjab,  on 16.08.2006.
 Gold Medal from Government of Punjab, presented by Raja Hamid, Nazim Potohar Town Rawalpindi on 16.08.2006. 
 Appreciation Certificate from Mr.Muhammad Asif Bilal Lodhi, Deputy Commissioner Chakwal, on 20.10.2014.
 Appreciation Certificate from Mr.Tanveer ur Rehman, Assistant Commissioner Talagang, on 28.10.2014.

References

External links 
  Musawir Munir Art Work Display- The News
  Lok Virsa Islamabad Exhibition
 Namal College Mainwali- Exhibition "Peace for All"
 Painting exhibition on Peace Day 

 عالمی ایوارڈ-یافتہ-مصور-منیر-ڈھرنال-کے-فن-پاروں-کی-نمائش 
 Art Exhibition at Islamabad 
  Munir Art's work conveys message of Peace

1955 births
Living people
Pakistani artists